Dorchester was an electoral district of the Legislative Assembly of the Parliament of the Province of Canada, in Canada East.  It was created in 1841, by the merger of two previous electoral districts of the Legislative Assembly of Lower Canada, Dorchester and Beauce. It was represented by one member in the Legislative Assembly. 

The electoral district was abolished in 1867, upon the creation of Canada and the province of Quebec.

Boundaries 

The Union Act, 1840 merged the two provinces of Upper Canada and Lower Canada into the Province of Canada, with a single Parliament.  The separate parliaments of Lower Canada and Upper Canada were abolished.Union Act, 1840, 3 & 4 Vict., c. 35, s. 2. 

The Union Act provided that while many of the pre-existing electoral boundaries of Lower Canada and Upper Canada would continue to be used in the new Parliament, some electoral districts would be defined directly by the Union Act itself.  Dorchester was one of those new electoral districts. The Union Act merged the previous electoral districts of the County of Dorchester and the County of Beauce, to create a new district, also called Dorchester.

Under the previous legislation, enacted in 1829, the former district of Dorchester had been based on the seigniory of Lauzon, on the south shore of the Saint Lawrence, near Lévis.

The former district of Beauce had been immediately to the south east of the former district of Dorchester, and was defined as follows:

The effect of the Union Act provision was to merge those two sets of boundaries into one district.  The Dorchester electoral district was thus south of Quebec City, between the Saint Lawrence and the border with the United States, in the current Chaudière-Appalaches administrative region.

Dorchester was a single-member constituency, represented by one member in the Legislative Assembly.

Members of the Legislative Assembly 

The following were the members of the Legislative Assembly from Dorchester.

Abolition 

The district was abolished on July 1, 1867, when the British North America Act, 1867 came into force, splitting the Province of Canada into Quebec and Ontario.  It was succeeded by electoral districts of the same name in the House of Commons of Canada and the Legislative Assembly of Quebec.

References 

Electoral districts of Canada East